The Osaka child abandonment case was a case of child abandonment involving two abandoned children in Osaka, Japan. It occurred on June 9, 2010 when Sanae Shimomura, a 23-year-old Japanese single mother in Osaka, sealed the door of her apartment shut, abandoning 3-year-old daughter Sakurako Hagi and 1-year-old son Kaede Hagi inside. Neighbors heard the children crying over many weeks until it suddenly subsided, but did not think anything more of this than simply children in a bad childhood phase. Since Shimomura did not come to work for several days, a colleague went to her place and noticed a strange smell beyond the door. When the police entered the apartment, they found the two children dead. Social workers had attempted to stop by the apartment several times over the course of the children's confinement, but never found anyone home. The apartment was in a lively, populated area, but nobody knew that the children were confined.

Shimamura was arrested on 30 July 2010. She was reported to have wanted free time for herself and was quoted as saying that she had grown "tired of feeding and bathing" her two children. She was sentenced to 30 years in prison for the murders. As of 2021, Shimamura remains imprisoned.

See also

Rie Fujii, concerning a very similar incident involving two children abandoned in an apartment in Calgary, Canada.
Sugamo child abandonment case, a similar incident that took place in a neighborhood near Tokyo, Japan.
Coin-operated-locker babies
Baby hatches
Child abandonment

References	

 
  
 

2010 crimes in Japan
Child abandonment
Child abuse resulting in death
Murdered Japanese children
Crime in Japan
History of Osaka Prefecture
Incidents of violence against boys
Violence against children
Incidents of violence against girls